An online savings account (OSA) is a savings account managed and funded primarily on the Internet.

Features
OSAs are often characterized by a higher interest rate or lower fees, compared with traditional savings accounts. 
Many of these high-yield accounts have no minimum balance.  Account holders may link their OSAs to their existing external bank accounts for easy transfer of funds between multiple accounts. Some also offer ATM cards so customers can directly access the funds in their OSAs.

Deposits and withdrawals
Some banks offering OSA's may not have bank branches and a customer may deposit funds into their account by either ACH transfer, mailing in a cheque, or direct deposit. To withdraw money, customers can initiate an ACH transfer into another account or sometimes request a check from the bank in the desired amount.

Changes in banking and investing
OSAs, combined with rising interest rates, have made cash an increasingly attractive investment option.  They provide a relatively low risk option for investors looking for a place to park their money, especially in uncertain economic times. Inflation, stagflation, recessionary fears and stock market volatility are among the economic indicators that have encouraged more and more investors to consider cash as a way to balance their portfolios.  In fact, more than 8.5 million customers signed up for OSAs with leading U.S. banks in 2005 alone, and some industry experts estimated the online savings account market would triple in size, from $250 billion to $400 billion by 2010.

See also
 Direct bank
 Online banking
Specific examples:
 HSBC Direct
 ING Direct

Notes 

Online banking